Dacryopilumnus is a genus of crabs belonging to the monotypic family Dacryopilumnidae.

The species of this genus are found in Pacific and Indian Ocean.

Species:

Dacryopilumnus eremita 
Dacryopilumnus rathbunae

References

Crabs
Decapod genera